The National Natural Landmarks (NNLs) in Florida include 18 of the almost 600 such landmarks in the United States. They cover areas of geological, biological and historical importance, and include springs, swamps, marshes and seashore. Several of the sites provide habitat for rare or endangered plant and animal species. The landmarks are located in 14 of the state's 67 counties. Four counties each contain all or part of two or more NNLs, while two landmarks is split between two counties. The first designation, Corkscrew Swamp Sanctuary, was made in 1964, while the most recent designation, Archbold Biological Station, was made in 1987. Owners include private individuals and several state and federal agencies.

The National Natural Landmarks Program is administered by the National Park Service, a branch of the Department of the Interior. The National Park Service determines which properties meet NNL criteria and, after notifying the owners, makes nomination recommendations. The Secretary of the Interior reviews nominations and, based on a set of predetermined criteria, makes a decision on NNL designation or a determination of eligibility for designation. Both public and privately owned properties can be designated as NNLs. Owners may object to the nomination of the property as a NNL. This designation provides indirect, partial protection of the historic integrity of the properties via tax incentives, grants, monitoring of threats, and other means.

National Natural Landmarks

See also 
National Register of Historic Places listings in Florida
List of Florida state parks

References
 General
 

Specific

Florida
National Natural Landmarks